Mulgi may be:
 Mulgi, Estonia, a village in Mulgi Parish, Estonia
 Mulgi Parish, Estonia
 Mulgimaa, cultural-historical region in Estonia
 A dialect of South Estonian, spoken in Mulgimaa
 Mire language